Edgar Cyril Robinson FRCO (11 May 1877 – 28 January 1953) was an English organist and composer.

Life

He was born in Gainsborough, Lincolnshire on 11 May 1877, the son of George Robinson and Eliza Jane Dyson. His father was organist at Gainsborough parish church for some 40 years, a position in which Edgar would succeed him.

He was educated at Lincoln Cathedral School and gained a Bachelor of Music degree from Oxford University. He was awarded FRCO in 1899. A new 3-manual organ by Walkers was installed in Gainsborough church in 1906 towards the end of his time there.p. 169

On 23 April 1915 he enlisted in No. 23 Squadron RFC and subsequently served overseas.

Appointments

Assistant organist at Lincoln Cathedral 1895 - 1899
Organist of Gainsborough Parish Church 1899 - 1906
Organist of All Saints' Church, Wigan 1906 - 1919
Choirmaster, Liverpool Cathedral (retired 1947)

Compositions

He composed a descant to the hymn tune, Miles Lane.

Family life
He married Evelyn Mary Buckmaster. They had two children:
Evelyn Mary Joyce Robinson  (1910-1990)
Katherine Norma Robinson (1914-1984)

References

1877 births
1953 deaths
English organists
British male organists
People from Gainsborough, Lincolnshire
Fellows of the Royal College of Organists
People educated at Lincoln Minster School